Hyaliodes is a genus of plant bugs in the family Miridae. There are at least 20 described species in Hyaliodes.

Species
These 24 species belong to the genus Hyaliodes:

References

Further reading

External links

 

Miridae